This was the first edition of the tournament.

Benjamin Becker won the title after Dudi Sela retired at 6–1, 2–6, 3–2 in the final.

Seeds

Draw

Finals

Top half

Bottom half

References
 Main Draw
 Qualifying Draw

PTT Cup - Singles
2013 - Singles